In mathematics, the Milliken–Taylor theorem in combinatorics is a generalization of both Ramsey's theorem and Hindman's theorem. It is named after Keith Milliken and Alan D. Taylor.

For each , call  an MTk set. Then, alternatively, the Milliken–Taylor theorem asserts that the collection of MTk sets is partition regular for each k.

References
.
.

Ramsey theory
Theorems in discrete mathematics